Park Jeong-su is a South Korean football player. He plays for Sagan Tosu on loan from Kashiwa Reysol having previously spent two years with Yokohama F. Marinos.

Club statistics
Updated to end of 2021 season.

References

External links
Profile at Kashiwa Reysol
Profile at Yokohama F. Marinos 

1994 births
Living people
South Korean footballers
J1 League players
J2 League players
Yokohama F. Marinos players
Kashiwa Reysol players
Sagan Tosu players
Association football defenders